RN-9893 is a drug which acts as a potent and selective blocker of the TRPV4 ion channel. It has been used to investigate the role of TRPV4 channels in the function of heart valves.

See also 
 HC-067047
 SET2

References 

Piperazines
Nitro compounds
Sulfonamides
Amides
Isopropyl compounds
Trifluoromethyl compounds